Events in the year 1971 in Mexico.

Incumbents

Federal government
 President: Luis Echeverría
 Interior Secretary (SEGOB): Mario Moya Palencia
 Secretary of Foreign Affairs (SRE): Emilio Óscar Rabasa
 Communications Secretary (SCT): Eugenio Méndez Docurro
 Education Secretary (SEP): Víctor Bravo Ahuja
 Secretary of Defense (SEDENA): Matías Ramos
 Secretary of Navy: Luis M. Bravo Carrera
 Secretary of Labor and Social Welfare: Rafael Hernández Ochoa
 Secretary of Welfare: Luis Enrique Bracamontes

Supreme Court

 President of the Supreme Court: Alfonso Guzmán Neyra

Governors

 Aguascalientes: Francisco Guel Jiménez
 Baja California
Raúl Sánchez Díaz Martell, until October 31
Milton Castellanos Everardo starting November 1, 1971
 Campeche: Carlos Sansores Pérez
 Chiapas: Manuel Velasco Suárez
 Chihuahua: Oscar Flores Sánchez
 Coahuila: Eulalio Gutiérrez Treviño
 Colima: Pablo Silva García
 Durango: Alejandro Páez Urquidi 
 Guanajuato: Manuel M. Moreno
 Guerrero: Caritino Maldonado Pérez/Roberto Rodríguez Mercado/Israel Nogueda Otero
 Hidalgo: Donaciano Serna Leal
 Jalisco: Francisco Medina Ascencio/Alberto Orozco Romero
 State of Mexico: Carlos Hank González 
 Michoacán: Servando Chávez Hernández
 Morelos: Felipe Rivera Crespo
 Nayarit: Roberto Gómez Reyes
 Nuevo León: Eduardo Elizondo/Luis M. Farías
 Oaxaca: Fernando Gómez Sandoval
 Puebla: Rafael Moreno Valle
 Querétaro: Juventino Castro Sánchez
 San Luis Potosí: Antonio Rocha Cordero
 Sinaloa: Alfredo Valdés Montoya
 Sonora: Faustino Félix Serna
 Tabasco: Mario Trujillo García
 Tamaulipas: Manuel A. Rabize	
 Tlaxcala: Luciano Huerta Sánchez
 Veracruz: Rafael Murillo Vidal
 Yucatán: Carlos Loret de Mola Mediz
 Zacatecas: Pedro Ruiz González
Regent of the Federal District
Alfonso Martínez Domínguez (until June 15)
Octavio Sentíes Gómez (starting June 15)

Events

 Aeronáutica Agrícola Mexicana SA formed.
 June 10: Corpus Christi massacre. 
 June 10: Opening of the Metro Observatorio. 
 September 3–13: Hurricane Fern. 
 September 5–18: Hurricane Edith. 
 November 11: National Institute of Astrophysics, Optics and Electronics is established.

Awards
Belisario Domínguez Medal of Honor – Jaime Torres Bodet

Births

February 
February 10 — Lorena Rojas, actress and singer (d. 2015)
February 22 — Super Caló, wrestler

May 
May 14 − Mónica Arriola Gordillo, politician (New Alliance Party), Deputy (2006-2009); (d. 2016).

June 
 June 16 – Alejandro Jano Fuentes, singer
 June 17 — Paulina Rubio, singer

July 
July 12 — Andrea Legarreta, actress and TV host

August 
 August 26 — Thalía, singer

November
November 24 — Jesús Rodríguez Almeida, acting Governor of Puebla 2018-2019

Date unknown 
 Emma Laura, soap opera actress

Deaths
 August 11 – Archbishop Manuel Pío López Estrada, 6th bishop of Veracruz, and first archbishop of Xalapa, 1939-1968 (b. May 5, 1891)

Film

 List of Mexican films of 1971.

Sport

 1970–71 Mexican Primera División season. 
 Charros de Jalisco win the Mexican League.
 September 19: Atlético Español founded.

References

External links

 
Mexico